Goalpara West Assembly constituency is one of the 126 assembly constituencies of Assam Legislative Assembly in the north east state of Assam, India. Goalpara West is also part of Dhubri Lok Sabha constituency.

Members of Legislative Assembly 
 1967: S. A. Jotder, Praja Socialist Party
 1972: S. A. Jotder, Indian National Congress
 1978: Nazmul Haque, Independent
 1983: Hassanuddin Ahmed, Indian National Congress
 1985: Sheikh Saman Ali, Independent
 1991: Nazmul Haque, Independent
 1996: Abu Bakar Siddique Jotdar, Indian National Congress
 2001: Sheikh Shah Alam, Nationalist Congress Party
 2006: Abdur Rashid Mandal, Indian National Congress
 2011: Sheikh Shah Alam, All India United Democratic Front
 2016: Abdur Rashid Mandal, Indian National Congress
 2021: Abdur Rashid Mandal, Indian National Congress.

Election results

2016 results

2011 results

2006 results

References

External links 
 

Assembly constituencies of Assam
Goalpara district